The 1958 United States Senate election in North Dakota took place on November 4, 1958, to elect a member of the United States Senate to represent the State of North Dakota, concurrently with other Class 1 elections to the Senate and various other federal, state, and local elections. 

Incumbent Republican Senator William Langer was re-elected to a fourth term, defeating a primary challenge from Lieutenant Governor Francis Clyde Duffy and winning the general election with 57.21% of the vote, defeating Democratic-NPL candidate Raymond G. Vendsel who won 41.49% of the vote. Two independent candidates, Arthur C. Townley and Custer Solem, also ran, had minimal impact on the outcome of the election, winning 1,700 (0.83%) and 973 (0.48%) votes, respectively. Townley was known as the creator of the National Non-Partisan League, and had previously sought North Dakota's other senate seat in 1956. This was the last time North Dakota's class 1 seat was won by a Republican until Kevin Cramer won it in 2018.

Election results

See also 
 1958 United States Senate elections

Notes

External links
1958 North Dakota U.S. Senate Election results

North Dak
1958
1958 North Dakota elections